Woolly ragwort is a common name for several plants and may refer to:

Packera tomentosa, native to eastern North America
Senecio garlandii, native to southeastern Australia
Senecio littoralis, native to the Falkland Islands